Rik is a masculine given name and nickname. Most common in Belgium, it is a short form of the Dutch language given name Hendrik or sometimes Frederik, Erik or Rikkert. As an English-language name it usually is a variant of Rick, a short form of Richard.

People with this name include:

 Rik Barnett (born 1990), English actor
 Rik Battaglia, stage name of Italian actor Caterino Bertaglia (born 1930)
 Bert Blyleven né Rik Aalbert (born 1951), Dutch-born American baseball pitcher
 Rik Bonness (born 1954), American football player
 Rik van den Boog (born 1959), Dutch managing director of FC Ajax
 Rik Carey (born 1966), Bahamian musician (short form of Patrick)
 Rik Clerckx  (1936–1985), Belgian long-distance runner
 Rik Coolsaet (born 1951), Belgian political scientist
 Rik Coppens (1930–2015), Belgian footballer
 Rik Cordero (born 1979), American film director
 Rik Daems (born 1959), Belgian politician and painter
 Rik Daniëls (born 1962), Belgian television director
 Rik De Deken  (1907–1960), Belgian footballer
 Rik De Saedeleer (1924–2013), Belgian footballer and sports commentator
 Rik de Voest (born 1980),  South African tennis player
 Rik Emmett (born 1953), Canadian guitarist and singer
 Rik Fox (born 1955), American heavy metal bassist
 Rik Grashoff (born 1961), Dutch engineer and politician
 Rik Hoevenaers (1902–1958), Belgian cyclist
 Rik van IJzendoorn (born 1987), Dutch cyclist
 Rik Isemborghs (1914–1973), Belgian footballer
 Rik Jaeken (born 1949), Belgian engineer and businessman
 Rik Janssen (born 1957), Dutch politician and businessman
 Rik Kemp (born 1939), Australian cartoonist
 Rik Kuypers (born 1925), Belgian film director
 Rik de Lange (born 1956), Dutch politician
 Rik Larnoe (1897–1978), Belgian footballer
 Rik Launspach (born 1958), Dutch actor, writer and director
 Rik Levins (died 2010), American comic book artist
 Rik Lopez (born 1979), English footballer
 Rik Makarem (born 1982), English actor
 Rik Mayall (1958–2014), English comedian
 Rik Massengale (born 1957), American golfer
 Rik Moorman (born 1961), Dutch cyclist
 Rik Offenberger (born 1964), American comic book journalist
 Rik Pinxten (born 1947), Belgian anthropologist
 Rik Renders (1922–2008), Belgian cyclist
 Rik Rue (born 1950), Australian experimental musician
 Rik Schaefels  (1827–1904), Belgian Romantic painter
 Rik Schaffer (born 1960s), American game composer
 Rik Schoofs (born 1950), Belgian long-distance runner
 Rik Sebens (born 1988), Dutch footballer
 Rik Simpson, British record producer
 Rik Smits (linguist) (born 1953), Dutch linguist, author, translator and editor
 Rik Smits (born 1966), Dutch NBA basketball player
 Rik Tommelein (born 1962), Belgian hurdler
 Rik Toonen (born 1954), Dutch water polo player
 Rik Torfs (born 1956), Belgian law scholar and politician
 Rik Van Brussel (born 1944), Belgian mechanical engineer
 Rik Van Linden (born 1949), Belgian cyclist
 Rik Van Looy (born 1933), Belgian cyclist
 Rik Van Nutter (1929–2005), American actor
 Rik Van Slycke (born 1963), Belgian cyclist
 Rik Van Steenbergen (1924–2003), Belgian cyclist
 Rik Vandenberghe (born 1953), Belgian sprinter
 Rik Verbrugghe (born 1974), Belgian cyclist
 Rik Vercoe (born 1972), British ultramarathon runner
 Rik Verheye (born 1986), Flemish actor
 Rik Waddon (born 1977), British cyclist
 Rik Waller (born 1981), English singer
 Rik Wheeler, nickname of Mortimer Eric Wheeler (1890–1976), British archaeologist and army officer
 Rik Wilson (born 1962), American ice hockey player
 Rik Wouters (1882—1916), Belgian painter and sculptor

Fictional characters include:
 Rik Ringers, eponymic comics reporter

See also
 Rijk de Gooyer (1925–2011), Dutch actor
 Rikk Agnew (born 1958), American rock musician

References

Dutch masculine given names
Hypocorisms